The Case of Miss Elliott was Baroness Orczy's first collection of detective stories. It appeared in 1905 and featured the first of her detective characters, The Old Man in the Corner, who solves mysteries without leaving his chair.

This is one of three books of short stories featuring Orczy's armchair detective, and although the first published it is second chronologically. The stories follow those in The Old Man in the Corner and precede those in Unravelled Knots.

The Old Man in the Corner stories first appeared in 1901 in The Royal Magazine, with the author receiving the large sum of £60. The stories were immediately popular, and the public clamoured for more.  The stories in this collection were published in The Royal Magazine in 1904 and 1905. They include

 The Case of Miss Elliott  
 The Hocussing of Cigarette
 The Tragedy in Dartmoor Terrace
 Who Stole the Black Diamonds?
 The Murder of Miss Pebmarsh
 The Lisson Grove Mystery
 The Tremarn Case
 The Fate of the Artemis
 The Disappearance of Count Collini
 The Ayrsham Mystery
 The Affair at the Novelty Theatre
 The Tragedy of Barnsdale Manor

Plot

Despite his vanity about his own talents, Bill Owen is a nondescript armchair detective. A balding, watery-eyed, mild-mannered little man in violently checked tweed, he haunts a corner of the ABC Teashop on the corner of Norfolk Street and the Strand.

His listener and protégé is the attractive young journalist Polly Burton. Polly brings him details of obscure crimes baffling the police, which he helps her to solve. She is fascinated by the unlikely unravellings she hears, but despite her sarcasm and pride in her own investigative talents she remains the learner, impressed in spite of herself.

Although The Old Man does not hide his upper class attitudes, he sometimes feels sympathy for the criminals.

The Old Man's cases include a wide range of sensational and complex detective puzzles: 
 murder ("The Tremarn Case"), 
 blackmail ("The Murder of Miss Pebmarsh"), 
 perfect alibis ("The Case of Miss Elliott"), 
 and thefts ("The Affair at the Novelty Theatre").

External links
 The Case of Miss Elliott at Project Gutenberg Australia
 

1905 short story collections
Short story collections by Baroness Emma Orczy
Mystery short story collections
Works originally published in The Royal Magazine